Porphyrosela dorinda is a moth of the family Gracillariidae. It is known from Hong Kong, India (Uttar Pradesh, Bihar, West Bengal), Japan (Ryukyu Islands), Malaysia, the Philippines (Mindoro and Luzon) and Taiwan.

The wingspan is 3-4.1 mm.

The larvae feed on Calopogonium, Desmodium species (including Desmodium gangeticum, Desmodium heterocarpon, Desmodium heterophyllum and Desmodium triflorum), Pueraria montana, Uraria lagopus and Uraria neglecta. They mine the leaves of their host plant. The mine consists of an irregular blotch-mine placed on a space between large veins of the lower surface of the leaflet. The mining part is whitish-green and flat at first but changes into whitish-brown and a tentiform type in the end. The lower epidermis of the mining part is finely wrinkled.

References

Lithocolletinae
Moths of Asia
Moths of Japan
Moths described in 1912

Lepidoptera of India
Moths of Malaysia
Taxa named by Edward Meyrick
Moths of the Philippines
Moths of Taiwan
Leaf miners